This is a list of all orienteering competitors found in Wikipedia and notable within the orienteering sport.

A 
 Alida Abola, Soviet Union
 Christian Aebersold, Switzerland
 Gunborg Ahling, Sweden
 Katarina Allberg, Sweden
 Johanna Allston, Australia
 Maja Alm, Denmark
 Dainora Alšauskaitė, Lithuania
 Svajūnas Ambrazas, Lithuania
 Marianne Andersen, Norway
 Ragnhild Bente Andersen, Norway
 David Andersson, Sweden
 Monica Andersson, Sweden
 Ari Anjala, Finland
 Topi Anjala, Finland
 Liisa Anttila, Finland
 Linda Antonsen, Norway
 Karolina Arewång-Höjsgaard, Sweden
 Heidi Arnesen, Norway
 Peter Arnesson, Sweden
 Johanna Asklöf, Finland
 José Arno Giriboni da Silva, Brazil
 Anna-Lena Axelsson, Sweden

B 
 Martin Bagness, United Kingdom
 Hana Bajtošova, Slovakia
 Yvette Baker, United Kingdom, won World Orienteering Championships short distance 1999 in Inverness
 Ruth Baumberger, Switzerland
 Eugenia Belova, Russia
 Jan Beneš, Czech Republic, became Junior World Champion in the middle distance in Druskininkai in 2006
 Anne Benjaminsen, Finland 
 Vidar Benjaminsen, Norway
 Stig Berge, Norway
 Alain Berger, Switzerland
 Morten Berglia, Norway
 Claes Berglund, Sweden
 Annika Billstam, Sweden
 Hanne Birke, Denmark
 Jimmy Birklin, Sweden, winner of the 2001 Sprint World Orienteering Championships
 Betty Ann Bjerkreim Nilsen, Norway
 Sture Björk, Sweden
 Anders Björkman, Sweden
 Ida Marie Bjørgul, Norway, received a silver medal in the middle distance at the 2007 Junior World Orienteering Championships in Dubbo, Australia
 Kjetil Bjørlo, Norway
 Bernt Bjørnsgaard, Norway
 Carl Henrik Bjørseth, Norway
 Claus Bloch, Denmark
 Grant Bluett, Australia
 Christina Blomqvist, Sweden
 Sören Bobach, Denmark
 Marianne Bogestedt, Sweden
 Anna Bogren, Sweden, won the 1993 short distance World Orienteering Championships
 Stefan Bolliger, Switzerland
 Chris Bonington, United Kingdom
 Katarina Borg, Sweden
 Outi Borgenström-Anjala, Finland
 Zoltán Boros, Hungary
 Kirsi Boström, Finland
 Mårten Boström, Finland
 Mikael Boström, Finland
 Irene Bucher, Switzerland
 Thomas Bührer, Switzerland
 Chris Brasher, United Kingdom 
 Ragnhild Bratberg, Norway
 Dana Brožková, Czech Republic
 Radka Brožková, Czech Republic
 David Brickhill-Jones, United Kingdom 
 Lucie Böhm, Austria

C 
 Astrid Carlson, Norway, relay silver at the 1979 World Orienteering Championships
 Lennart Carlström, Sweden
 Sten-Olof Carlström, Sweden
 Adam Chromý, Czech Republic
 Ksenia Chernykh, Russia, individual gold medals at the 2007 and 2008 World MTB Orienteering Championships
 Barbora Chudíková, Czech Republic
 Jana Cieslarová, Czech Republic
 Nicolo Corradini, Italy
 Laure Coupat, France
 Kristin Cullman, Sweden
 Alicia Cobo, Spain, finalist in World Orienteering Championships in Finland 2013

D 
 Kalle Dalin, Sweden
 Luca Dallavalle, Italy
 Kristin Danielsen, Norway
 Anke Dannowski, Germany
 Marian Davidik, Slovakia
 Sergey Detkov, Russia
 Troy de Haas, Australia
 Tomáš Dlabaja, Czech Republic
 Jon Duncan, United Kingdom 
 Magne Dæhli, Norway
 Sigurd Dæhli, Norway

E 
 Elise Egseth, Norway
 Roman Efimov, Russia
 Anne Berit Eid, Norway
 Silje Ekroll Jahren, Norway
 Lena Eliasson, Sweden
 Babben Enger-Damon, Norway
 Bo Engdahl, Sweden
 Emma Engstrand, Sweden
 Josefine Engström, Sweden
 Håkan Eriksson, Sweden

F 
 Beata Falk, Sweden
 Mari Fasting, Norway
 Zsuzsa Fey, Romania
 Mette Filskov, Denmark
 Jan Fjærestad, Norway
 Urs Flühmann, Switzerland
 Aila Flöjt, Finland
 Ivar Formo, Norway
 Petri Forsman, Finland
 Per Fosser, Norway
 Torunn Fossli Sæthre, Norway
 Jon Fossum, Norway
 Martin Fredholm, Sweden
 Owe Fredholm, Sweden
 Hanni Fries, Switzerland
 Bernt Frilén, Sweden
 Martina Fritschy, Switzerland
 Tero Föhr, Finland

G 
 Alain Gafner, Switzerland
 Svatoslav Galík, Czechoslovakia
 Jana Galíková, Czech Republic
 Torbjørn Gasbjerg, Denmark
 Emy Gauffin, Sweden
 Michaela Gigon, Austria
 François Gonon, France
 Anna Górnicka-Antonowicz, Poland
 Anette Granstedt, Sweden
 Kerstin Granstedt, Sweden
 Stina Grenholm, Sweden
 Graham Gristwood, United Kingdom
 Ruslan Gritsan, Russia
 Andrei Gruzdev, Russia
 Thierry Gueorgiou, France
 Linnea Gustafsson, Sweden
 Maria Gustafsson, Sweden
 Anders Gärderud, Sweden

H 
 Paula Haapakoski, Finland
 Troy de Haas, Australia
 Ingrid Hadler, Norway
 Åge Hadler, Norway
 Kerstin Haglund, Sweden
 Mats Haldin, Finland
 Steven Hale, United Kingdom
 Øystein Halvorsen, Norway
 Arja Hannus, Sweden
 Astrid Hansen, Norway
 Atle Hansen, Norway
 Dorthe Hansen, Denmark
 Anna Hanzlová, Czechoslovakia
 Lena Hasselström, Sweden
 Anders Hauge, Norway
 Svetlana Haustova, Russia
 Anne Margrethe Hausken, Norway
 Ágnes Hegedűs, Hungary
 András Hegedus, Hungary
 Fabian Hertner, Switzerland
 Stine Hjermstad Kirkevik, Norway
 Lars Holmqvist, Sweden
 Bodil Holmström, Finland
 Mária Honzová, Czech Republic
 Michal Horáček, Czech Republic
 Magda Horváth, Hungary
 Holger Hott, Norway
 Sandy Hott, Canada
 Daniel Hotz, Switzerland
 Raila Hovi, Finland
 Tuula Hovi, Finland
 Martin Howald, Switzerland
 Daniel Hubmann, Switzerland
 Dieter Hulliger, Switzerland
 Dominik Humbel, Switzerland
 Ruth Humbel, Switzerland
 Jarkko Huovila, Finland
 Birgitte Husebye, Norway

I 
 Pasi Ikonen, Finland
 Ulf Forseth Indgaard, Norway
 Joakim Ingelsson, Sweden
 Elisabeth Ingvaldsen, Norway
 Lena Isaksson, Sweden
 Peter Ivars, Finland
 Johan Ivarsson, Sweden
 Egil Iversen, Norway

J 
 Adrian Jackson, Australia
 Svein Jacobsen, Norway
 Wenche Jacobsen, Norway
 Helena Jansson, Sweden
 Marlena Jansson, Sweden
 Jaroslav Jašek, Czechoslovakia
 Michal Jedlička, Czech Republic
 Karin Jexner, Denmark
 Sonja Johannesson, Sweden
 Egil Johansen, Norway, Sweden
 Helle Johansen, Norway
 Arne Johansson, Sweden
 Birgitta Johansson, Sweden
 Erik Johansson, Sweden
 Jenny Johansson, Sweden
 Karl Johansson, Sweden
 Martin Johansson (born 1984), Sweden
 Martin Johansson (born 1964), Sweden
 Sofie Johansson, Sweden
 Karl John, Switzerland
 Erja Jokinen, Finland
 Heli Jukkola, Finland
 Niclas Jonasson, Sweden
 Anssi Juutilainen, Finland
 Virpi Juutilainen, Finland
 Carsten Jørgensen, Denmark

K 
 Carl Waaler Kaas, Norway
 Simona Karochová, Czech Republic
 Timo Karppinen, Finland
 Jorma Karvonen, Finland
 Ari Kattainen, Finland
 Minna Kauppi, Finland
 Raila Kerkelä, Finland
 Mattias Karlsson, Sweden
 Matti Keskinarkaus, Finland
 Seppo Keskinarkaus, Finland
 Ernst Killander, Sweden
 Björn Kjellström, Sweden
 Jan Kjellström, Sweden
 Andrey Khramov, Russia
 Eduard Khrennikov, Russia
 Emma Klingenberg, Denmark
 Signe Klinting, Denmark
 Štěpán Kodeda, Czech Republic
 Erkki Kohvakka, Finland
 Reeta-Mari Kolkkala, Finland
 Hannu Koponen, Finland
 Viktor Korchagin, Russia
 Vladislav Kormtshikov, Russia
 Natalia Korzhova, Russia
 Rolf Koskinen, Finland
 Eija Koskivaara, Finland
 Hanna Kosonen, Finland 
 Annariitta Kottonen, Finland
 Hannu Kottonen, Finland
 Magdolna Kovács, Hungary
 Petr Kozák, Czech Republic
 Tatiana Kozlova, Russia
 Anastasia Kravchenko, Russia
 Annichen Kringstad, Sweden
 Ragnhild Kristensen, Norway
 Øystein Kristiansen, Norway
 Per Kristiansen, Norway
 Vojtěch Král, Czech Republic
 Simonas Krėpšta, Lithuania
 Marcela Kubatková, Czech Republic
 Ada Kuchařová, Czech Republic
 Mika Kuisma, Finland
 Urho Kujala, Finland
 Sinikka Kukkonen, Finland
 Sirpa Kukkonen, Finland
 Ivan Kuzmin, Russia
 Olle Kärner, Estonia
 Vroni König-Salmi, Switzerland

L 
 Jani Lakanen, Finland
 Andrey Lamov, Russia
 Jukka Lanki, Finland
 Björn Lans, Sweden
 Jan Martin Larsen, Norway
 Ann Larsson, Sweden
 Birgitta Larsson, Sweden
 Marc Lauenstein, Switzerland
 Kjell Lauri, Sweden
 Alice Leake, United Kingdom
 Bengt Leandersson, Sweden
 Bengt Levin, Sweden
 Arto Lilja, Finland
 Katri Lindeqvist, Finland
 Ulla Lindkvist, Sweden
 Pete Livesey, United Kingdom
 Petr Losman, Czech Republic
 Vladimír Lučan, Czech Republic
 Marie Lund, Sweden
 Olav Lundanes, Norway
 Anne Lundmark, Sweden
 Susanne Lüscher, Switzerland
 Lars Lystad, Norway
 Magne Lystad, Norway
 Tomas Löfgren, Sweden
 Barbro Lönnkvist, Sweden
 Jenny Lönnkvist, Sweden
 Lars Lönnkvist, Sweden
 Fredrik Löwegren, Sweden
 Niklas Löwegren, Sweden

M 
 Valborg Madslien, Norway
 Helena Mannervesi, Finland
 Michael Mamleev, Italy and Russia
 Daniel Marston, United Kingdom
 Bernard Marti, Switzerland
 Reijo Mattinen, Finland
 Stig Mattsson, Sweden
 Annelies Meier, Switzerland
 Anja Meldo, Finland
 Hans Melin, Sweden
 Naďa Mertová, Czechoslovakia
 Matthias Merz, Switzerland
 Marika Mikkola, Finland
 Pepa Milusheva, Bulgaria
 Eva Moberg, Sweden
 Johan Modig, Sweden
 Allan Mogensen, Denmark
 Heather Monro, United Kingdom
 Sarolta Monspart, Hungary
 Anders Morelius, Sweden
 Jonathan Musgrave, United Kingdom
 Lea Müller, Switzerland
 Agneta Månsson, Sweden
 Kerstin Månsson, Sweden
 Jörgen Mårtensson, Sweden
 Matti Mäkinen, Finland
 Jussi Mäkilä, Finland 
 Vesa Mäkipää, Finland
 Hannu Mäkirinta, Finland
 Ulla Mänttäri, Finland
 Willi Müller, Switzerland

N 
 Simone Niggli-Luder, Switzerland
 Kiril Nikolov, Bulgaria
 Cecilia Nilsson, Sweden
 Kajsa Nilsson, Sweden
 Anders Nordberg, Norway
 Björn Nordin, Sweden
 Bertil Nordqvist, Sweden
 Sivar Nordström, Sweden
 Bertil Norman, Sweden
 Valentin Novikov, Russia
 Olga Novikova, Russia
 Julia Novikova, Russia
 Petra Novotná, Czech Republic
 Radek Novotný, Czech Republic
 Arja Nuolioja, Finland
 Simo Nurminen, Finland
 Risto Nuuros, Finland
 Gun-Britt Nyberg, Sweden
 Sanna Nymalm, Finland
 Olle Nåbo, Sweden
 Mona Nørgaard, Denmark

O 
 Ingrid Ohlsson, Sweden
 Marie Ohlsson, Sweden
 Mirja Ojanen, Finland
 Dagfinn Olsen, Norway
 Tommy Olsen, Norway
 Jörgen Olsson, Sweden
 Kent Olsson, Sweden
 Katalin Oláh, Hungary
 Ellen Sofie Olsvik, Norway
 Yuri Omeltchenko, Ukraine, winner of the 1995 World Orienteering Championships short distance

P 
 Keijo Parkkinen, Finland
 Stephen Palmer, United Kingdom
 Lars Palmqvist, Sweden
 Hilde Gjermundshaug Pedersen, Norway
 Lasse Brun Pedersen, Denmark
 Juha Peltola, Finland
 Katharina Perch-Nielsen, Switzerland
 Raino Pesu, Finland
 Anna Persson, Sweden
 Lina Persson, Sweden
 Gert Pettersson, Sweden
 Håkan Pettersson, Sweden
 Rolf Pettersson, Sweden
 Marja Liisa Portin, Finland
 Dana Procházková, Czechoslovakia
 Mirja Puhakka, Finland
 Markus Puusepp, Estonia
 Pekka Pökälä, Finland
 Tolentino Paz, Brazil

R 
 Karin Rabe, Sweden
 Katja Rajaniemi, Finland
 Helena Randáková, Czech Republic
 Merja Rantanen, Finland
 Kimmo Rauhamäki, Finland
 Kjersti Reenaas, Norway
 Marte Reenaas, Norway
 Damien Renard, France
 Marianne Riddervold, Norway
 Baptiste Rollier, Switzerland
 Marie-Luce Romanens, Switzerland
 Björn Rosendahl, Sweden
 Erik Rost, Sweden
 Irén Rostás, Hungary
 Jørgen Rostrup, Norway
 Rudolf Ropek, Czech Republic
 Vilma Rudzenskaitė, Lithuania
 Johan Runesson, Sweden
 Marita Ruoho, Finland
 Pirjo Ruotsalainen, Finland
 Tatiana Ryabkina, Russia
 Seppo Rytkönen, Finland
 Astrid Rødmyr, Norway

S 
 Tore Sagvolden, Norway
 Kari Sallinen, Finland
 Raili Sallinen, Finland
 Juhani Salmenkylä, Finland
 Leena Salmenkylä, Finland
 Janne Salmi, Finland
 Markku Salminen, Finland
 Hanne Sandstad, Norway
 Tore Sandvik, Norway
 Lena Samuelsson, Sweden
 Eveli Saue, Estonia
 Ieva Sargautytė, Lithuania
 Sanna Savolainen, Finland
 Christine Schaffner, Switzerland
 Karin Schmalfeld, Germany
 Ruth Schmid, Switzerland
 David Schneider, Switzerland
 Alex Schwager, Switzerland
 Frauke Schmitt Gran, Germany
 Pirjo Seppä, Finland
 Olga Shevchenko, Russia
 Maria Shilova, Russia
 Lauri Sild, Estonia
 Sixten Sild, Estonia
 Timo Sild, Estonia
 Kaija Silvennoinen, Finland
 Leena Silvennoinen, Finland
 Ivan Sirakov, Bulgaria
 Martins Sirmais, Latvia
 Aliya Sitdikova, Russia
 Anders Skarholt, Norway
 Ola Skarholt, Norway
 Lars Skjeset, Norway
 Marita Skogum, Sweden
 Torben Skovlyst, Denmark
 Hanne Sletner, Norway
 Bill Smith (Fell runner), United Kingdom
 Peter Snell, New Zealand
 Michal Smola, Czech Republic
 Hanne Staff, Norway
 Markus Stappung, Switzerland
 Eivor Steen-Olsson, Sweden
 Marta Štěrbová, Czech Republic
 Jamie Stevenson, United Kingdom
 Søren Strunge, Denmark
 Kine Hallan Steiwer, Norway
 János Sotér, Hungary
 Örjan Svahn, Sweden
 Olavi Svanberg, Finland
 Eva Svensson, Sweden
 Harald Svergja, Norway
 Šárka Svobodná, Czech Republic
 Gunilla Svärd, Sweden
 Helene Söderlund, Sweden
 János Sőtér, Hungary

T 
 Veijo Tahvanainen, Finland
 Olli-Markus Taivainen, Finland
 Silja Tarvonen, Finland
 Heimo Taskinen, Finland
 Jorunn Teigen, Norway
 Hilde Tellesbø, Norway
 Chris Terkelsen, Denmark
 Ekaterina Terekhova, Russia
 Mika Tervala, Finland
 Aimo Tepsell, Finland
 Margrit Thommen, Switzerland
 Harald Thon, Norway
 Øyvin Thon, Norway
 Petter Thoresen, Norway
 Jan-Erik Thorn, Sweden
 Pertti Tikka, Finland
 Vadim Tolstopyatov, Russia
 Natalia Tomilova, Russia
 Päivi Tommola, Finland
 Eivind Tonna, Norway
 Hannele Tonna, Finland
 Marcel Tschopp, Liechtenstein
 Dmitriy Tsvetkov, Russia
 Staffan Tunis, Finland
 Tuomo Tompuri, Finland
 Jon Tvedt, Norway
 Håvard Tveite, Norway

U 
 Kjetil Ulven, Norway
 Siri Ulvestad, Norway
 Lars-Henrik Undeland, Sweden

V 
 Maret Vaher, Estonia
 Géza Vajda, Hungary
 Indrė Valaitė, Lithuania
 Bjørnar Valstad, Norway
 Pekka Varis, Finland
 Liisa Veijalainen, Finland
 Linda Verde, Norway
 Kirill Veselov, Russia
 Rolf Vestre, Norway
 Annika Viilo, Finland
 Galina Vinogradova, Russia
 Renata Vlachová, Czechoslovakia
 Tatiana Vlasova, Russia
 Brit Volden, Norway
 Giedrė Voverienė, Lithuania
 Edgaras Voveris, Lithuania
 Matti Väisänen, Finland
 Mervi Väisänen, Finland
 Seppo Väli-Klemelä, Finland

W 
 Ann-Marie Wallsten, Sweden
 Michael Wehlin, Sweden
 Eystein Weltzien, Norway
 Emil Wingstedt, Sweden
 Brigitte Wolf, Switzerland
 Dieter Wolf, Switzerland
 Ingunn Hultgreen Weltzien, Norway

Z 
 Annika Zell, Sweden

Å 
 Gunborg Åhling, Sweden
 Tobias Åslund, Sweden

Ā 
 Valters Āboliņš, Latvia

Ö 
 Peter Öberg, Sweden
 Göran Öhlund, Sweden
 Gunnar Öhlund, Sweden
 Kaspar Öttli, Switzerland

Ø 
 Marit Økern, Norway
 Øystein Kvaal Østerbø, Norway

By country 
 Australian orienteers
 Austrian orienteers
 British orienteers
 Bulgarian orienteers
 Czech orienteers
 Czechoslovak orienteers
 Danish orienteers
 Estonian orienteers
 Finnish orienteers
 French orienteers
 German orienteers
 Hungarian orienteers
 Italian orienteers
 Latvian orienteers
 Lithuanian orienteers
 New Zealand orienteers
 Norwegian orienteers
 Polish orienteers
 Romanian orienteers
 Russian orienteers
 Slovak orienteers
 Soviet orienteers
 Swedish orienteers
 Swiss orienteers
 Ukrainian orienteers

Innovators 
 Chris Brasher, one of the pioneers of orienteering in Britain and can claim the first public mention of the sport in an article in The Observer in 1957
 Ernst Killander, one of the people who made the sport of orienteering popular in Scandinavian countries
 Björn Kjellström, orienteering champion and co-founder of the compass manufacturing company Silva Sweden AB
 Jan Kjellström, played an important role in the development of the sport of orienteering in Great Britain
 Per Kristiansen, involved in orienteering training in Norway and also written several books on handbook on training and competition
 Martin Kronlund, introduced and developed the sport of orienteering in Spain
 Jan Martin Larsen, pioneer in the development of the specialized orienteering map

References

 
Orienteering
Orienteers